Theodore Pietsch may refer to:
 Theodore Wells Pietsch I (1868–1930), American architect
 Theodore Wells Pietsch II (1912–1993), American automobile stylist and industrial designer
 Theodore Wells Pietsch III (born 1945), American ichthyologist